The 2017 Icelandic Athletics Championships was the 91st edition of the national outdoor track and field championships for Iceland. It was held from 8–9 July at Selfossvöllur in Selfoss. It served as the selection meeting for Iceland at the 2017 World Championships in Athletics.

Results

Men

Women

References

91. Meistaramót Íslands - 8.7.2017 - Selfoss. MotFri. Retrieved 2019-07-14.

External links
 Icelandic Athletics Federation website 

Icelandic Athletics Championships
Icelandic Athletics Championships
Icelandic Athletics Championships
Icelandic Athletics Championships
Southern Region (Iceland)